Yves Chastan (born 20 April 1948 in Dieulefit, Drôme) was a member of the Senate of France from 2008 to 2014. He represented the Ardèche department as a member of the Socialist Party.

References
Page on the Senate website

1948 births
Living people
People from Drôme
French Senators of the Fifth Republic
Politicians from Auvergne-Rhône-Alpes
Socialist Party (France) politicians
Senators of Ardèche
21st-century French politicians